The 1922 Montana State Bobcats football team was an American football team that represented Montana State College (later renamed Montana State University) in the Rocky Mountain Conference (RMC) during the 1922 college football season. The Bobcats compiled a 4–4 record (0–1 against RMC opponents), finished last in the conference, and outscored all opponents by a total of 128 to 127. The team lost the annual rivalry game to Montana by a 7–6 score on Armistice Day.

The 1922 season was the school's first under head coach Ott Romney. Romney was hired in the fall of 1922 as both the football coach and as head of the Department of Athletics. He attended the University of Utah and transferred to Montana State as a senior.

Quarterback Ray McCarren was the team captain. McCarren was a senior, studying electrical engineering. He also played for the baseball and basketball teams and served as the Commissioner of Athletics.

Three players received all-state honors: McCarren at quarterback; Champ Hannon at guard; and Frank Hatfeld at end.

Schedule

Personnel

Players
The following players played for the 1922 football team:

 William Bawden - fullback
 John Brittain - center
 Clarence Bryan - halfback
 Dewey Cashmore - guard
 Edward Cates
 Alvin Cleveland - guard
 Frank Cowan - tackle
 Norman DeKay - end
 Glenn Fox - halfback
 Champ Hannon - guard, all-state 1922
 Frank Hatfield - end, all-state 1922
 Bruce Hollister - end
 Carl Husemeyer - end
 Arthur Jorgenson
 Leoanrd Jourbert - tacle
 Frank Knight - tackle
 Donald LeCornu - guard
 John Mashin - end, all-state 1920 and 1921
 Donald "Scotty" MacDonald - tackle
 Ray "Hoss" McCarren - captain, quarterback, all-state 1921 and 1922
 Verl McCoy - guard
 Tracy McGuin - fullback
 Arthur McDonald - halfback, chosen captain for the 1923 team
 Kenneth McIvor - center
 George Rassley - quarterback
 Glenn Sands - guard
 Tom Shoebotham - quarterback
 Robert Walter - halfback

Staff
 Ott Romeny - football coach and director of physical education
 George Van Fleet - football manager
 Harry McCann - assistant football manager

References

Montana State
Montana State Bobcats football seasons
Montana State Bobcats football